El Barón is an American telenovela produced by Sony Pictures Television and Telemundo Global Studios for Telemundo that premiered on 30 January 2019 and ended on 25 April 2019. It stars Francisco Angelini as the titular character. El Barón tells the story of Ignacio Montero, a young Mexican rebel, dreamer and visionary who changed the world of drug trafficking.

Cast 
 Francisco Angelini as Ignacio "Nacho" Montero / El Barón
 María Elisa Camargo as Isabel García
 Jorge Luis Moreno as Joe Fernández
 Variel Sánchez as Ramiro Villa "El Paisa
 Mauricio Mejía as Pablo Escobar
 Gabriel Tarantini as Justin Thompson
 Tania Valencia as Judy Caicedo
 Lorena Garcia
 Julián Diaz as Mister Drake
 Kornel Doman as David Liebermann
 Andrés Echevarría as Paul Thompson
 Juana Arboleda as Griselda Blanco "La Madrina
 Natasha Klauss as Carla
 Carlos Camacho as Angel Zamora
 Kristina Lilley as Ana Farley
 Michelle Rouillard as Marcela
 Julio Bracho as Géronimo Montero
 Carolina Gómez as María Clara
 Pedro Suárez as Alberto
 Juan Pablo Llano as Mauricio Jaramillo
 Juan Calero
 David Ojalvo as Logan
 Tim Janssen as Kyle Brown
 James Lawrence as Lewis

Reception 
The series premiered with a total of 1.03 million viewers. The first twenty episodes aired weekdays at 10pm/9c. Due to low ratings, on 4 March 2019 the series moved to the 1am/12c timeslot and episodes are uploaded on the Telemundo app and Telemundo On Demand.

Episodes

References

External links 
 

Telemundo telenovelas
2019 American television series debuts
2019 American television series endings
2019 telenovelas
American telenovelas
Spanish-language American telenovelas
Sony Pictures Television telenovelas
Television shows remade overseas